To Plant a Seed is the debut studio album by American metalcore band We Came as Romans. It was released by Equal Vision Records on November 3, 2009 and was produced by Joey Sturgis. Artwork for the album was done by Paul Romano to which coincides to We Came as Romans' positive message as explained by guitarist Joshua Moore that the lyrical themes on To Plant a Seed are based-up spreading this message. A deluxe edition of the album was released on January 18, 2011 which includes one bonus track and a DVD entitled To Plant a DVD.

The songs "Dreams" and "Intentions" were re-recorded from the band's Dreams EP.

Cover
The album cover depicts a "very innocent looking boy in which the 'seed' has been planted in his mind and it grows to his heart, out of his palms and becomes branches" as described by Moore.

Track listing
All songs written by Joshua Moore and Dave Stephens.

To Plant a DVD chapter listings 
 01. Intro
 02. To Plant a Seed (Live)
 03. Making the Band
 04. Intentions (Live)
 05. Music with Meaning
 06. We Are the Reasons (Live)
 07. Tour Life
 08. To Move On Is to Grow (Live)
 09. Wacko Jacko
 10. Roads That Don't End And Views That Never Cease (Live)
 11. Credits
 12. To Move On Is to Grow (Video)

Charts

Personnel
We Came as Romans
 David Stephens – unclean vocals
 Kyle Pavone – clean vocals, keyboards, piano, synthesizer
 Joshua Moore – lead guitar, backing vocals
 Lou Cotton – rhythm guitar
 Andy Glass – bass guitar, backing vocals
 Eric Choi – drums
Production
 Produced, engineered, mixed, and mastered by Joey Sturgis
Additional editing by Nick Sampson
 Programming and additional keys by Joey Sturgis
 Art direction, artwork and design by Paul Romano
 Photography by Phil Mamula
 Management by Matthew Stewart & Mike Mowery for Outerloop Management
 Booking by JJ Cassiere for The Kirby Organisation
 A&R by D. Sandshaw

References

2009 debut albums
Equal Vision Records albums
We Came as Romans albums
Albums produced by Joey Sturgis